Iraq has a network of highways connecting it from the inside among the Iraq provinces and to the outside neighboring countries: Iran, Turkey, Syria, Jordan, Saudi Arabia and Kuwait. When Saddam Hussein visited the United States in the 1980s, he was impressed by the size and infrastructure of the highway system. He ordered his engineers to build highways in the American form - wide lanes, shoulders and clover leaves.

Motorways numbers 

( M1 ) Motorway 1 . Near Kuwait Border- Baghdad- Jordan Border (Iraq)
( 31 ) Motorway 31 . Basra- M1 Junction (Iraq)
( M88 ) Motorway 88 . Route 2 junction - Syria Border (Iraq)
 ( M90 ) Motorway 90 . Erbil - Duhok (Iraq)
 ( M120 ) Motorway 120 . Erbil Ring Road (Iraq)
 ( M150 ) Motorway 150 . Erbil Ring Road (Iraq)

Highways numbers 

Highway 1: Baghdad, Taji, Samarra, Tikrit, Mosul, Syria (Kameshli).
 Highway 2: Baghdad, Baqubah, Al Khalis, Kirkuk, Irbil, Mosul, Dohuk, Zakhu, Turkey (Silopi).
 Highway 3: Erbil to Iran (Piranshahr).
 Highway 4: Kirkuk, Sulaymaniyah, Darbinadikhan, Jalaulah, As Sa'Diyah.
 Highway 5: Baqubah, Muqdadiyah, As Sa'Diyah, Khanaqin, Iran (Qasr-e Shirin).
 Highway 6: Baghdad, Al Kut, Al Amarah, Basrah.
 Highway 7: Al Kut, Ash Shatrah, Nasiriyah.
 Highway 8: Baghdad, Al Hillah, Al-Qādisiyyah, As Samawah, Nasiriyah, Basrah, Kuwait.
 Highway 9: Karbala, Al Najaf, Al-Qādisiyyah.
 Highway 10: Al Rutbah, Jordan.
 Highway 11: Baghdad, Al Fallujah, Al Ramadi, Al Rutbah, Syria.
 Highway 12: Al Ramadi, Hīt, Haditha, Al-Karābilah, Syria (Abu Kamal).

Roads numbers 

 Road 13: Khanaqin, Mandak, Badra, Jalat, Shaykh Faris
 Road 14: Ali Al-Gharbi, Jalat
 Road 15: Badra, Iran (Mehran)
 Road 16: Nasiriyah, Amarah
 Road 17: Diwaniyah, Qalat Sukkar, Amarah
 Road 18: Erbil, Suleymaniyah
 Road 19: Haqlaniyah, Bayji, Kirkuk
 Road 20: Safra, Rutba
 Road 21: Toliaha, Nukhayb
 Road 22: Karbala, Nukhayb
 Road 23: Faluja, Samarra
 Road 24: Takrit, Kirkuk
 Road 26: Basra, Umm Qasr
 Road 27: Hilla, Numaniya, Sarhad
 Road 28: Abu Suhayr, Samawa
 Road 29: Samawa, As Salman, Basra
 Road 30: H-3 Air Base, Jordan
 Road 31: Basra, North Rumaila
 Road 34: Baghdad to Baqubah
 Road 46: Arbat, Iran
 Road 47: Mosul, Syria
 Road 55: Takrit, Tuz Khurmato
 Road 70: Hilla, Najaf, Abu Suhair
 Road 71: Abu Suhayr, Diwaniyah
 Road 80: Kirkuk, Mosul
 Road 82: Baquba, Mandak
 Road 84: Karbala, Hilla
 Road 96: Numbered as Freeway 1: Jordan Junction, Jodran
 Road 97: Baghdad, Abu Ghurayb

Statistics on roads in Iraq
Total: 
Paved: 
Unpaved: , 1996 est.

References

Iraq
Highways
Highways
Highways